Real socialism, better known as actually existing socialism or developed socialism, was an ideological catchphrase popularized during the Brezhnev era in the Eastern Bloc countries and the Soviet Union.

The term referred to the Soviet-type economic planning implemented by the Eastern Bloc at that particular time. From the 1960s onward, countries such as Poland, East Germany, Hungary, Czechoslovakia, and Yugoslavia began to argue that their policies represented what was realistically feasible given their level of productivity, even if it did not conform to the Marxist concept of socialism.

The concept of real socialism alluded to a future highly developed socialist system. The actual party claims of nomenclatory socialism began to acquire not only negative, but also sarcastic meanings. In later years and especially after the dissolution of the Soviet Union, the term began to be remembered as only one thing, i.e. as a reference for Soviet-style socialism.{{#tag:ref|See definitions and descriptions of "real socialism" in the following:
 Kyu-Young Lee, "System Transformation in Poland since 1989:  A view on the transformation of the real-socialist system." Including List of References.  Graduate School of International Studies, Sogang University.
 Krzysztof Brzechczyn,  The Collapse of Real Socialism in Eastern Europe. Adam Mickiewicz University, Department of Philosophy. The Journal of Interdisciplinary Studies in History and Archaeology. Vol. 1, No. 2, pp. 105–133 
 Jacek Tittenbrun, The Collapse of 'Real Socialism` in Poland. Paul & Co Pub Consortium 
 Robert W. Cox,  "Real socialism" in historical perspective. Pages 177–183. Google Docs. Retrieved November 3, 2011. See term: "actually existing socialism" in Rudolph Bahro's The Alternative in Eastern Europe, Note 3, p. 190.|group=note}}

Definition
After World War II, the terms "real socialism" or "really existing socialism" gradually became the predominating euphemisms used as self-description of the Eastern Bloc states' political and economical systems and their society models. De jure often referred to as "(democratic) people's republics", these states were ruled by a communist party, some of which were ruled autocratically and had adapted a form of planned economy and propagated socialism and/or communism as their ideology. The term "real (-ly existing) socialism" was introduced to explain the obvious gap between the propagated ideological framework and the political and economical reality faced by these states' societies. As US Communist Party activist Irwin Silber put it in 1994,The term 'actually existing socialism’ is not (despite the quotation marks) a sarcasm; in fact, while obviously containing an implicit irony, the phrase itself was coined by Soviet Marxist-Leninists and was widely used by the Communist Party of the Soviet Union (CPSU) and its supporters in polemics with those who postulated a model of socialism significantly different from the system developed in the Soviet Union. Its point was that various alternatives to the Soviet-derived model existed only in the minds of their advocates, while 'actual socialism' existed in the real world.

The term was taken up by some dissidents, such as Rudolf Bahro, who used it in a more critical way.

The role of the Sino-Soviet split
Another aspect of the term real socialism related to the Sino-Soviet split and other ideological disagreements between the Soviet Union and its satellite states on one side and the People's Republic of China and the followers of a more Maoist brand of communist ideology on the other. The Sino-inspired communist movement, which had grown so rapidly worldwide as a "radical left" alternative to Soviet ideas, had claimed that the Soviet Union was no longer socialist and had betrayed the revolution. To counter this claim of Marxist revisionism, the Soviets called their version "real socialism", implying that other models of socialism were unrealistic.

Soviet popular culture
The term was also used in an ironical criticism. The "reality" of "real socialism" was used against it. In particular, the term became a target of numerous political jokes in the Soviet Union, the following being typical examples:

"Do you know the boundary between real socialism and communism?" – "The border runs along the Kremlin's wall" [hinting that only rulers of the Soviet Union live in the bright communist future promised by Karl Marx].
"What is real socialism?" – "This is when you cannot yet get everything without money, but you already cannot buy anything for your money" [hinting at the long lines and frequent shortages of consumer goods in the Soviet stores].
Armenian Radio was asked: "Is it possible to build real socialism in Armenia?". Armenian Radio answers: "Yes, but it would be better to do it in Georgia".

See also

Actually existing capitalism
Communist state
Marxism–Leninism
Moderately prosperous society
Primary stage of socialism
Soviet-type economic system
State capitalism
State socialism
Transition economy

 Notes 

 References 
 Citations 

 Sources 
 General

 Real socialism from A Dictionary of Sociology'', 1998, originally published by Oxford University Press.

Ideology of the Communist Party of the Soviet Union
Socialism
Comecon
Economy of the Soviet Union
Soviet phraseology
Political economy